was a Japanese novelist. She was considered "the female Shintaro Ishihara".

Biography 
Born Kunie Nemoto (邦枝根本), Iwahashi was born in Hiroshima. Her mother and father were both teachers and Christians. The family evacuated from Hiroshima to Saga, Kyushu two months before the atomic bombing of Hiroshima in 1945.

Iwahashi's career began when she gained attention for her writing while attending Ochanomizu Women's College. Her short story "Gyakukoosen" was one of these early works. It was adapted into a movie by the Nikkatsu film studio.  Iwahashi graduated in 1957 with a degree in pedagogical sociology. The same year, she was employed as a special feature writer for a magazine.

Personal life 
She married in 1957 and had one daughter. Iwahashi's husband died of cancer in 1983.

Awards 
 1982 -  for the short story collection Asai Nemuri
 1986 -  for the novel Hanryo
 1992 -  for the novel Ukihashi
 1994 -  for her biography of Hasegawa Shigure
 2012 - Murasaki Shikibu Prize for her biography of Nogami Yaeko

Bibliography

References 

1934 births
2014 deaths
20th-century Japanese women writers
21st-century Japanese women writers
Japanese women short story writers
Japanese women novelists
Writers from Hiroshima
Japanese biographers
Women biographers